Blemus discus is a ground beetle species in the genus Blemus.

See also
 List of ground beetle (Carabidae) species recorded in Britain

References

External links

Trechinae
Beetles described in 1792